Bicol Standard is a weekly newspaper in the Bicol Region.  It covers news from the provinces of Camarines Sur, Camarines Norte, Albay, Sorsogon and Masbate.

History
Newspaper Bicol Standard was established in 1992 by longtime journalist Gil Basmayor, Jr.

References

External links

Weekly newspapers published in the Philippines
Newspapers published in Luzon ex-Manila
Publications established in 1992
Mass media in Albay
Mass media in Camarines Norte
Mass media in Camarines Sur
Mass media in Catanduanes
Mass media in Masbate
Mass media in Sorsogon